Aleksandar Seksan (born 24 August 1968) is a Bosnian actor. He has appeared in more than thirty films since 1997. Most notably, he starred in the 2003 multiple award-winning Bosnian film Remake and 2016 Bosnian film Death in Sarajevo.

Selected filmography

Film

Television

References

External links 

1968 births
Living people
Bosnia and Herzegovina male actors